The M425 and M426 Tractor trucks (G671) were 5 ton (4,536kg) load rated 4x2 semi-tractors that were used from 1944 on by the US Army. They are famous for the use on the Red Ball Express from Normandy to the front, but were also used in the China Burma India Theater. After the war they were used in Europe, including during the Berlin Crisis, and in the Korean War.

History 
Designed and first  manufactured by International Harvester, later Kenworth and Marmon-Herrington also built them. The official model number was 542, to which are added a prefix letter designating the manufacturer of the engine (thus 'H' from Harvester) and a suffix number relating to the tire size. The M426 was a heavier duty evolution of the M425. All model H-542-9 M425s were built by International, H542-11 M426s were built by all three companies. 1,200 M425s were upgraded to M426 standards.

Engine and driveline 

The engine in these vehicles was an International Red Diamond 450D, a  overhead valve inline 6 cylinder gasoline engine developing  at 2700 rpm.

The clutch was made by W.C. Lips, Model Z-32-S, and the transmission was an IHC Model F-54-D. This transmission had 5 forward and one reverse speed. The first speed was very low, fifth speed was direct.

Chassis 

All models had a ladder frame with two axles on semi elliptical leaf springs. A set back front axle allowed a wheelbase of only , allowing a very short turn radius.

The M425 and M426 were general service load carriers, designed to haul load over roads, so they didn't need to be 4 x 4. The front axle was an I-beam, the rear was a double reduction full floating type. International used their own front and rear axles, Kenworth and Marmon-Herrington used Timkens.

Brakes were full air with drum brakes on all wheels. Trailer brakes could be used independently of the tractor. A disk type hand brake was mounted on the propeller shaft.

M425s had 9.00x20 size tires, while M426s had larger 11.00x20s with stronger springs and a slightly longer  wheelbase. All had dual rear tires. Except for the difference in the size of the tires, and some minor details, all types are mechanically identical.

All models were a cab over engine design with a military style open cab.

Trailers 
Both had a single axle with dual rear tires, and a stake-and-platform body.

Gallery

References 

International Harvester vehicles
Kenworth vehicles
Military trucks of the United States
Vehicles introduced in 1944
Marmon-Herrington vehicles